Qırıqlı or Kyrykhly or Kyrykly may refer to:
Qırıqlı, Goranboy, Azerbaijan
Qırıqlı, Goygol, Azerbaijan